Mirjaveh (also Romanized as Mīrjāveh; also known as Mīrjāwa) is a city and the capital of Mirjaveh County, in Sistan and Baluchestan Province, Iran. At the 2006 census, its population was 13,590, in 2,350 families.

Mirjaveh is the main road crossing point between Iran and Pakistan. The Pakistani border post is at Taftan. Mirjaveh is also the point where the railway line from Pakistan crosses the border on the way from Quetta to Zahedan.

Transport 

Since construction of this railway line in 1921, it has been isolated, with no through connection to any other Iranian Railway system.  Around 2007, steps were taken to build a link from the rest of the Iranian Railway system via Bam to connect with the Pakistan Railway system. This link is now finished. As the gauges of the Iranian and Pakistan railways are different, being standard gauge and  broad gauge respectively, a break-of-gauge station and transshipment hub (or transloading hub) were built at Zahedan.

See also

Mirjawa railway station

References

Populated places in Mirjaveh County
Cities in Sistan and Baluchestan Province
Iran–Pakistan border crossings